The Valea Bădenilor (also: Bădeanca) is a left tributary of the river Dâmbovița in Romania. Its source is in the Leaota Mountains. It flows into the Dâmbovița in Bădeni.

Tributaries

The following rivers are tributaries to the river Valea Bădenilor (from source to mouth):

Left: Valea Râiosului, Valea Vâjei, Tâncava, Tăbra, Valea Gruiului
Right: Valea Hotarului, Valea Făgețelului, Valea Babei, Valea Rea, Valea lui Brusture, Valea lui Dăniș

References

Rivers of Romania
Rivers of Argeș County